"Just Came Back" is a song by Canadian musician Colin James. The song was released as the lead single from his second studio album, Sudden Stop. The song peaked at #5 on the Canadian RPM Singles chart, and is James' biggest hit to date. The song was the fourth-most played Cancon song in Canada of 1990. In 1991, the song won the Juno Award for Single of the Year.

Charts

Weekly charts

Year-end charts

References

External links 

1990 singles
1990 songs
Virgin Records singles
Juno Award for Single of the Year singles
Colin James songs